A mole is a massive structure, usually of stone, used as a pier, breakwater, or a causeway separating two bodies of water.  A mole may have a wooden structure built on top of it that resembles a wooden pier.  The defining feature of a mole, however, is that water cannot freely flow underneath it, unlike a true pier. The oldest known mole is at Wadi al-Jarf, an ancient Egyptian harbor complex on the Red Sea, constructed ca. 2500 BCE.

The word comes from Middle French mole, ultimately from Latin mōlēs, meaning a large mass, especially of rock; it has the same root as molecule and mole, the chemical unit of measurement.

San Francisco Bay Area

In the San Francisco Bay Area in California, there were several moles, combined causeways and wooden piers or trestles extending from the eastern shore and utilized by various railroads, such as the Key System, Southern Pacific Railroad (two), and Western Pacific Railroad: the Alameda Mole, the Oakland Mole, and the Western Pacific Mole. By extending the tracks the railroads could get beyond the shallow mud flats and reach the deeper waters of the Bay that could be navigated by the Bay Ferries.  A train fell off the Alameda Mole through an open drawbridge in 1890 killing several people.  None of the four Bay Area moles survive today, although the causeway portions of each were incorporated into the filling in of large tracts of marshland for harbor and industrial development.

A large mole was completed in 1947 at the San Francisco Naval Shipyard in the Bayview-Hunters Point neighborhood of San Francisco to accommodate the large Hunters Point gantry crane. The mole required  of fill.

World War II

Dunkirk evacuation

The two concrete moles protecting the outer harbour at Dunkirk played a significant part in the evacuation of British and French troops during World War II in May/June 1940.  The harbour had been made unusable by German bombing and it was clear that troops were not going to be taken directly off the beaches fast enough.  Naval captain W. G. Tennant had been placed ashore to take charge of the navy shore parties and organise the evacuation.  Tennant had what proved to be the highly successful idea of using the East Mole to take off troops.  The moles had never been designed to dock ships, but despite this, the majority of troops rescued from Dunkirk were taken off in this way. James Campbell Clouston, pier master on the east mole, organised and regulated the flow of men on that site.

Churchill Barriers

The Churchill Barriers are a series of four causeways in the Orkney Islands with a total length of 1.5 miles (2.4 km).  They link the Orkney Mainland in the north to the island of South Ronaldsay via Burray and the two smaller islands of Lamb Holm and Glimps Holm.

The barriers were built in the 1940s as naval defences to protect the anchorage at Scapa Flow. They were commissioned following the sinking of HMS Royal Oak in 1939 by German U-boat U-47 which had penetrated the existing defences of sunken blockships and anti-submarine nets.  The barriers now serve as road links, carrying the A961 road from Kirkwall to Burwick.

Heptastadion

Notable in antiquity was the Heptastadion, a giant mole built in the 3rd century BC in the city of Alexandria, Egypt to join the city to Pharos Island where the Pharos lighthouse stood. The causeway formed a barrier separating Alexandria's oceanfront into two distinct harbours, an arrangement which had the advantage of protecting the harbours from the force of the strong westerly coastal current. The Heptastadion is also believed to have served as an aqueduct while Pharos was inhabited, and geophysical research indicates that it was part of the road network of the ancient city. Silting over the years resulted in the former dyke disappearing under several metres of accumulated silt and soil upon which the Ottomans built a town from 1517 onwards. Part of the modern city of Alexandria is now built on the site.

English Tangier

When the Kingdom of England acquired the north African city of Tangier as English Tangier in 1661, the English began building a mole to improve the harbour. Work began on the mole in August 1663 and continued for some years under a succession of Governors. With an improved harbour the town would have played the same role that Gibraltar later played in British naval strategy.
However, Parliament expressed concern about the cost of maintaining the Tangier garrison, and by 1680 King Charles II had threatened to give up Tangier unless the supplies were voted for its sea defences. A crippling blockade by the Jaysh al-Rifi finally forced the English to withdraw from Tangier in 1683. The King gave secret orders to abandon the city, level the fortifications, destroy the harbour, and evacuate the troops. Samuel Pepys was present at the evacuation and wrote an account of it.

Stone quaysides

Stone quaysides are sometimes called moles.  A well-known example is the Molo in Venice.  It is the site of the Doge's Palace and two pillars which form a gateway to the sea.  It has been depicted numerous times by artists such as Canaletto.

Namibia

In Swakopmund, on the coast of Namibia, a mole was built in 1899. Designed by the engineer F. W. Oftloff, it was intended to develop the city's harbour. However, the Benguela Current continually deposited sand onto the mole until it became a promontory. The adjacent area has since become a popular leisure beach, known as the Mole Beach.

See also
 Breakwater (structure)
 Seawall
 Groyne
 Jetty

References

External links 
 
 

Building engineering

da:Mole
es:Muelle (construcción)
lt:Molas
no:Molo
pl:Molo
sv:Pir